, literally meaning " of the universe", is a title used in . Historically, jagadgurus have established a lineage and an institution to spread dharma which has been based in Varanasi, the centre of Sanskrit study.

Origin and history of the term
 is of Sanskrit origin where jagat means 'the entire world' and guru means 'spiritual master' (literally, 'dispeller of darkness'). In the classics and scriptures, the word has been used for several Devas.

Traditional Jagadgurus
In Hinduism, the three great acharyas  Adi Shankara, Madhvacharya and Ramanuja are combinedly known as "Acharyatraya" or "Triacharya". These three acharyas are considered to be the pillars of Vedantic tradition of spiritual India.

Acharyatraya

Other acharya's
  Mahaprabhu ( 1479 –  1531), founder of  school of

Jagadguru as title
Traditionally the title Jagadguru is used by all the peetadhipathis of Mathas founded by traditional Jagadgurus such as Adi Shankaracharya, Ramanujacharya, Madhvacharya, Nimbarkacharya, and Vallabhacharya.

Jagadguru is also honoured as the title by Kashi Vidvat Parishat in Varanasi for the knowledge and value of particular guru. The title "Jagadguru Ramanandacharya" is used in the lineage of Ramananda, founder of Ramanandi Sampradaya.
He was honoured with the title Jagadguru by Kashi Vidvat Parisat on 14 January 1957.
 Rambhadracharya (born 14 January 1950), founder of Tulsi Peeth following Ramanandi Sampradaya. He was conferred the title Jagadguru Ramanandacharya by Kashi Vidvat Parishat on 24 June 1988.
 Sadhu Bhadreshdasji (born 1967), disciple of Brahmaswarup Pramukh Swami Maharaj and swami of the BAPS Swaminarayan Sampradya, author of the 'Prasthāntrayi Swāminārāyan Bhāshyam'” and the 'Swāminārāyan-Siddhānt-Sudhā'; established the Akshar-Purushottam Darshan.

References

Bibliography

External links
 Jagadguru Rambhadracharya Handicapped University
 Jagadguru Sri Shivarathreeshwara Academy of Higher Education and Research
 Spiritual master of the whole world
 Jagatguru Das Brahmacari

Titles and occupations in Hinduism
Hindu philosophical concepts